The Great Southern and Western Railway (GS&WR) Class 900 consisted of a pair of 4-8-0T locomotives designed by E.A. Watson and introduced in 1915 and 1924 as a heavy shunter and banker for use on the relatively severe gradient from Kingsbridge to Clondalkin.

Design
The locomotives were unique as being the only locomotives with eight-coupled driving wheels on the Irish  gauge, though Watson had chosen to dismiss drawings for at 0-8-2T prepared under his predecessor R. E. L. Maunsell.  The cylinders drove the leading coupled driving axle.  Some components were common with GS&WR Class 362 and 368.

Operation
They were noted as being prone to derailment on sidings which could have sharp curves and be poorly ballasted, though thin flanges on the middle driving wheels combined with a long wheelbase and additional weight on the leading axle may equally have been factors.  Engine 900 was later converted to a [4-6-2T] by removing the coupling rods to the rear driving wheels.

Engine 901 was introduced nine years after 900 by J.R. Bazin, and was the only engine to be introduced by the Great Southern Railway which existed for less than two months before being joined with the Dublin and South Eastern Railway to form Great Southern Railways (GSR).

The engines were not particularly successful and were regarded as surplus to requirements and withdrawn after a short life by 1931 as it was found their work could be adequately performed by standard locomotives.

Model
There is a detailed O Gauge model of engine 900 in the Fry model railway collection.

References

4-8-0T locomotives
5 ft 3 in gauge locomotives
Railway locomotives introduced in 1913
Scrapped locomotives
Steam locomotives of Ireland